A periegesis (Ancient Greek περιήγησις 'leading around') is a geographical survey or travelogue, sometimes also called a periodos ' journey around' [sc. the world].

It is the name of several books:

 Pausanias's Ἑλλάδος περιήγησις Hellados Periegesis 'Periegesis of Greece', in prose, usually translated as Description of Greece
 Dionysius Periegetes of Alexandria's Οικουμένης περιήγησης Periegesis of the World, in hexameter, usually translated Survey of the World
 Avienius's Latin translation of Dionysius Periegetes
 Priscian's Latin translation of Dionysius Periegesis Prisciani, in hexameter
 Pseudo-Scymnus's Scymni Chii Periegesis, correctly called Περίοδος του Νικομήδη
 Mnaseas of Patras's Periegesis or Periplus

See also

 Periplus, an itinerary of ports and coastal landmarks
 Periodos ges of Hecataeus of Miletus